Professional Ski Simulator is an isometric 3D sports simulation game released by Codemasters in 1987 for the ZX Spectrum, Commodore 64, and Amstrad CPC. It was later released for the Atari ST and Amiga as Advanced Ski Simulator.

Gameplay
Gameplay consists of simulated downhill skiing of increasing difficulty. Players can race against each other, or against the computer. The slope must be completed passing through all of the checkpoints and within a time limit. The game is viewed in overhead isometric 3D perspective.

The game screen always tracks the leading contestant, so if a player falls too far behind he will lose sight of his skier. However, an icon map in the corner of the screen shows the locations of both players and the checkpoints, enabling a skilled player to still complete the race.

Reviews 
Sinclair User wrote in 1987:

References

External links 

Professional Ski Simulator at Lemon 64
Advanced Ski Simulator at Atari Mania
Advanced Ski Simulator at Lemon Amiga

1987 video games
Video games with isometric graphics
ZX Spectrum games
Amstrad CPC games
Commodore 64 games
Skiing video games
Atari ST games
Amiga games
Codemasters games
Multiplayer and single-player video games
Video games developed in the United Kingdom